The Yangtze Insurance is a 7 floor building in Shanghai and was completed from 1920s. It was built by architects P & T Architects Limited (Palmer and Turner).

References
 Buildings of the Bund

Buildings and structures in Shanghai
The Bund